Mount Chaudoin is an abrupt mountain rising to about  in the west part of the Gonville and Caius Range, Victoria Land, Antarctica. The mountain forms part of the divide between Bachtold Glacier and the head of Griffiths Glacier.

It was named by the Advisory Committee on Antarctic Names in 2007 after YNC Robert L. Chaudoin U.S. Navy (Seabees), who at the time was the Senior Administrative Yeoman to the commanding officer and member of the construction crew which built the original McMurdo Station and the original South Pole Station in the 1955–57 pre-IGY period. He also was the first U.S. Navy Postal Clerk at the South Pole Station, 1956.

References
 

Mountains of Victoria Land
Scott Coast